Ederney St Joseph's is a Gaelic football club based in the village of Ederney, County Fermanagh, Northern Ireland.

History
The club was first founded in May 1929, and went through various incarnations before winning their first Fermanagh Senior Football Championship title in 1968, beating Newtownbutler by 3–7 to 2–6.

In 2004, Martin McGrath became Ederney's first All Star.

Ederney reached the county finals in both 2006 and 2018, losing heavily to Enniskillen Gaels and Derrygonnelly Harps respectively. After a fifty-two year wait the club finally added its second senior championship in 2020, beating Derrygonnelly 2–8 to 1–6 in the final.

Notable players
 Martin McGrath

Honours
 Fermanagh Senior Football Championship (2): 1968, 2020
 Fermanagh Intermediate Football Championship (4): 1966, 1979, 1989, 2005
 Fermanagh Junior Football Championship (4): 1939, 1951, 1969, 1973

References

External links
 Ederney St Joseph's Official Website

Gaelic football clubs in County Fermanagh
Gaelic games clubs in County Fermanagh